Professor Anne Tiernan is from Brisbane, Queensland, Australia.  Tiernan is a writer, educator, political scientist, and consultant in areas of public administration, public policy and research analysis. She is known for her research expertise in policy and has presented at conferences both nationally and internationally.  She has a regular weekly radio slot on 'Weekends with Tim Cox' on 612 ABC Brisbane. Tiernan is currently the Professor at the Centre for Governance and Public Policy at Griffith University and Fellow of ANZSOG.

Education 
Professor Anne Tiernan attended high school at St Rita's College, Clayfield, and studied Politics and Government at Griffith University.

Career 
Tiernan began her early career working in government both at a Commonwealth and Queensland level in both consultancy and teaching capacities. Some of her roles have included Commissioner at the Queensland Crime and Corruption Commission, and Member of the Board of Commissioners of the Queensland Public Service Commission.

Tiernan was a member of the Board of Directors, St Rita's College between 2013 and 2015.

Tiernan was appointed as Professor of Australian Government and Politics at The University of Melbourne between July 2015 and November 2016.

Tiernan appeared at an event for the 2017 Brisbane Writers Festival in Brisbane, Queensland, Australia.

Tiernan is the author of The Gatekeepers: Lessons from Prime Ministers' Chiefs of Staff (both with R.A.W. Rhodes, MUP 2014),  which included information about 11 former chiefs of staff ; Lessons in Governing: A Profile of Prime Ministers’ Chiefs of Staff and Learning to be a Minister: Heroic Expectations, Practical Realities (with Patrick Weller, MUP 2010) ; and Caretaker Conventions in Australasia: Minding the Shop for Government (ANU Press 2014) (with Jennifer Menzies).

Selected articles
 Tiernan, A. (2015). The dilemmas of organisational capacity. Policy and Society, 34(3), 209-217.
 Rhodes, R. A. W., & Tiernan, A. (2015). Focus groups and prime ministers’ chiefs of staff. Journal of Organizational Ethnography, 4(2), 208-222.
 Dickinson, H., Katsonis, M., Kay, A., O'Flynn, J., & Tiernan, A. (2015). Looking to the Past and the Future of the Australian Journal of Public Administration. Australian Journal of Public Administration, 74(1), 1-4.
 Tiernan, A. (2015). Craft and Capacity in the Public Service. Australian Journal of Public Administration, 74(1), 53-62.
 Tiernan, A. (2015). Reforming Australia's Federal Framework: Priorities and Prospects. Australian Journal of Public Administration, 74(4), 398-405.
 Rhodes, R. A. W., & Tiernan, A. (2014). Prime Ministers’ Chiefs of Staff: Coping with wild treachery and weirdness. In D. Alexander and J. Lewis (eds), Making Public Policy Decisions: Expertise, skills and experience. Abingdon, Oxon: Routledge, p. 146-165.
 Tiernan, A. & Menzies, J. (2015). Caretaker Conventions. In B. Galligan, B. & S. Brenton (eds), Constitutional Conventions in Westminster Systems: Controversies, Changes and Challenges. Cambridge: Cambridge University Press, p. 91-115.

References 

Living people
1968 births
21st-century Australian women writers
21st-century Australian writers
Australian non-fiction writers